The Sundial Lodge, also known today as the L’Auberge Carmel, a Relais & Châteaux property, is a historic Medieval Revival hotel in Carmel-by-the-Sea, California. It was designed by architect Albert L. Farr of San Francisco Bay Area and was built in 1929–1930, by Master builder Michael J. Murphy. It was designated as an important commercial building in the city's Downtown Historic District Property Survey, and was recorded with the Department of Parks and Recreation on December 5, 2002.

History

The Sundial Lodge is a three-story, wood framed Medieval Revival style hotel built around an interior courtyard. The exterior walls have smooth cement stucco. It has five interior stucco-clad chimneys. It is located on Monte Verde Street and 7th Avenue in Carmel-by-the-Sea, California. The building qualifies for inclusion in the Downtown Historic District Property Survey because it is an example one of the few remaining Medieval Revival designs from the early 1930s that has maintained its original appearance, and it is a good example of Medieval Revival design by San Francisco Bay Area architect Albert L. Farr. The concentration of Medieval Romanantic revival buildings in the area of Monte Verde Street, Ocean Avenue and Lincoln Avenue helped to define Carmel as a "European" village.

The design of the lodge was inspired by Allen Knight's visit to eastern Europe in the late 1920s, where he enjoyed the old European charm of the hotels. He asked the owners of a Czech hotel in Prague to share their blueprints with him. It was these blueprints he gave to architect Albert L. Farr to use to design the Sundial apartments. He commissioned Farr to design the apartment building and Michael J. Murphy to do the construction on the property where his aunts had a home. Allen Knight's parents and his two aunts purchased three lots on Monte Verde Street 7th Avenue. On the property was a cottage that Knight's father had purchased and assembled from real estate developer James Franklin Devendorf. Knight had to move their home on the building site to a new location at Guadalupe Street and Sixth Avenue. Knight got financial backing for the construction of the residential apartment building from friends Mary L. Hamlin and Alys Miller. Knight later served as the Carmel city councilman and mayor.

The August 30, 1929, edition of the Carmel Pine Cone stated: 

In December 1929, the Carmel Pine Cone announced the newly started hotel, that "A block below, Monte Verde Street has gained by the newly started Sundial Court apartments, between Seventh and Eighth. The architecture is European, probably more Bohemian than of any other national type, and fits in well with Carmel's general scheme."

On May 23, 1930, M. J. Murphy, Inc., completed the contract for the Sundial Court Apartments. The hotel officially opened in June 1930, with an announcement in the Carmel Pine Cone saying: "Sundial Court Apartments ready June first on Monte Verde south of Ocean. Mrs. Mary L. Hamlin Manager". Originally, the lobby had two spaces for shops on the first floor, and the second floor housed three rooms apartments with a living area, a disappearing closet-bed, kitchenette and bath. The third floor has an extra room with a bath, which could be rented separately or used to make existing apartments larger. In 1992, the Sundial Court Apartments became the Sundial Lodge turning the 21 apartments into 19 guestrooms decorated with a French country motif and was featured in the Architectural and History Survey of Carmel-by-the-Sea Historic Inns. The Sundial Court Apartments was the first apartment building in Carmel.

In 1951, Canadian born artist Henrietta Shore's studio was at the Sundial Lodge. She once gave Knight a painting as her rent payment. In the early 1950's, Ernest K. Gann wrote Soldier of Fortune in a room at the Sundial Lodge, and his typist used the large dressing room as a sleeping room.

In 2003, the Sundial Lodge was sold for an undisclosed price to the Mirabel Hotel and Restaurant Group. CEO David Fink, changed the name to L'Auberge Carmel. In 2004, the Mirabel Hotel and Restaurant Group re-opened the hotel, after a two-year closer to bring it back to its 1929 appearance. The hotel was restored, reconfiguring all 20 guest rooms, the entrance and landscaping. A million dollar remodel was done in 2012 that included extensive upgrades to all guest-rooms, lobby, courtyard, and the Aubergine restaurant.

Mary L. Hamlin

Mary L. Hamlin (1856-1947) was manager of the Pine Inn in 1909. She became the owner of El Monte Verde Hotel on the Southwest corner of Monte Verde Avenue at Ocean Avenue. In 1928 she sold The Monte Verde and partnered with Allen Knight to build the Sundial Lodge. She was born as Mary E. LaCount, on September 8, 1856, in Auburn, New York. Her father was Peter LaCount (1817-1884) and mother was Maria Boon (1830-1910). She married William H. Hamlin in 1879. They had two children during their marriage.

When her children grew up, she left her family and moved to California in 1908 to join her sister Emma, who lived in Fresno, California. Hamlin and her sister bought a summer home in Carmel-by-the-Sea, California. By 1909, she became the manager of the Pine Inn on Ocean Avenue. During this time she became the owner of El Monte Verde Hotel. In 1924, she hired contractor Percy Parkes to undertake a major remodel of the hotel. Hamlin sold El Monte Verde Hotel in 1928. She then worked with Allen Knight to build the Sundial Lodge further south on Monte Verde Street. She continued to live at the Sundial when she retired in her late 80s.

She died on August 11, 1947, in Carmel-by-the-Sea, at the age of 90. She was buried in Syracuse, New York.

See also
List of hotels in the United States

References

External links

 Downtown Conservation District Historic Property Survey
 Historical Context Statement Carmel-by-the-Sea
 L’Auberge Carmel

1929 establishments in California
Carmel-by-the-Sea, California
Buildings and structures in Monterey County, California